Arnaud Ducret (born 6 December 1978) is a French actor and comedian.

Life and career

In 2013, he plays Gaby alongside Alix Poisson (Isa) in Parents mode d'emploi, a series broadcast on France 2 that shows him a very large audience.
The same year, he plays Eric in Serial Teachers and Serial Teachers 2.

Filmography

Theater

References

External links

 
 

1978 births
Living people
French male film actors
French male television actors
French comedians
Actors from Rouen
Cours Florent alumni
21st-century French male actors
French male stage actors